Footlocker may refer to:

 Footlocker (luggage), a type of trunk or chest
 Foot Locker, an American sportswear and footwear retailer